Capital Yachts Corporation, also called Capital Yachts, Inc. was an American boat builder based in Harbor City, California. The company operated as a division of Lindsey Plastics and specialized in the design and manufacture of fiberglass sailboats.

History
The company was founded by Jon Williams and Bill Smith in 1971 when they purchased the tooling for the Newport series of boats from Elgin National Industries of New York, who owned Newport Boats. Capital Yachts put the Newport series back into production and also had new boats designed by American naval architect Gary Mull and the Canadian design firm of Cuthbertson & Cassian, famous for the C&C Yachts series. Williams and Smith had their start as sailboat dealers in the area of Santa Monica, California, before moving into manufacturing.

The company produced boats in three marketing lines: Gulf, Neptune and Newport, ranging in size from the  Neptune 16 to the  Newport 41.

In a 2010 review Steve Henkel noted that the company was focused on low-price over quality construction using iron keels in place of lead ones.

The company continued until business was suspended in 1996.

Boats 

Summary of boats built by Capital Yachts:

Newport 27-1 - 1970
Gulf 27 - 1971
Gulf 32 - 1971
Gulf 39 - 1971
Newport 20 - 1971
Newport 30-1 - 1971
Newport 33 - 1971
Newport 33 PH - 1971
Newport 41 - 1971
Newport 27S - 1974
Newport 28 - 1974
Newport 30-2 - 1974
Newport 41S - 1974
Newport 27-3 - 1975
Neptune 24 - 1978
Newport 27S-2 - 1978
Neptune 16 - 1981
Gulf 29 - 1982
Newport 28-2 - 1982
Newport 41 Mark II - 1982
Newport 30-3 - 1984
Newport 41 Mark IIIA - 1984
Newport 31 - 1987

See also
List of sailboat designers and manufacturers

References

External links

Capital Yachts